Thomas Stafford Williams  (born 20 March 1930) is a cardinal in the Catholic Church, and before his retirement in 2005 was the fifth Archbishop of Wellington.

Early life and education
Williams was born in Wellington, New Zealand and educated at Holy Cross Primary School, Seatoun; SS Peter and Paul School, Lower Hutt; St. Patrick's College, Wellington; and St Kevin's College, Oamaru. He obtained a Bachelor of Commerce degree at Victoria University, Wellington, and worked for some years as an accountant. During his studies, he was deeply involved in the Catholic Youth Movement (YCW) and for a period worked full-time for the movement. In 1954 he commenced studies for the priesthood at the National Seminary, Holy Cross College, Mosgiel, Dunedin. In 1956 he was sent to the Pontifical Urban University in Rome, where he obtained a licentiate in theology and was ordained a priest on 20 December 1959. Later he received a social sciences degree from University College Dublin.

Priesthood
Returning to Wellington, he served as assistant pastor and as Director of Studies at the Catholic Enquiry Centre. He left that post when he volunteered to serve as a missionary in Samoa (today the Archdiocese of Samoa-Apia), where he was parish priest for 5 years. He returned to New Zealand in 1963 and became parish priest at St. Patrick's in Palmerston North for two years. This was followed by four years as Director of the Catholic Enquiry Centre in Wellington. In 1971 he moved to Leulumoega, Samoa and returned to New Zealand in 1976 to the Holy Family Parish in Porirua East. He celebrated the 60th year of his ordinantion in December 2019.

Church leader
He became Archbishop of Wellington on 20 December 1979 – his 20th anniversary of priestly ordination – following the death of Reginald Cardinal Delargey. His principal consecrator was Owen Snedden, long-term Auxiliary Bishop of Wellington. Williams was created Cardinal-Priest of the titular church of Jesus the Divine Teacher at Pineta Sacchetti by Pope John Paul II on 2 February 1983.
 He was additionally appointed Military Ordinary in 1995. He was appointed a Member of the Order of New Zealand, New Zealand's highest civilian honour, in the 2000 Queen's Birthday Honours.

Moral campaigns
He campaigned strongly against the passage of the law allowing civil unions in New Zealand saying it would turn New Zealand into a "moral wasteland". He also campaigned against the expansion of casinos.

Conclave and retirement
Williams was one of the cardinal electors who participated in the 2005 papal conclave that elected Pope Benedict XVI. He resigned as Archbishop of Wellington on 21 March 2005 having reached the age of 75 years and was succeeded by the then Coadjutor Archbishop, John Dew.

Selected works
In his own words: a tribute to Cardinal Thomas Williams.

See also
List of living cardinals

References

External links
 
Thomas Stafford Cardinal Williams profile at Catholic Hierarchy website
NZ Catholic Bishops Conference bio of Thomas Stafford Cardinal Williams 
Catholic Archdiocese of Wellington website

1930 births
Living people
People educated at St. Patrick's College, Wellington
People educated at St Kevin's College, Oamaru
Holy Cross College, New Zealand alumni
Members of the Order of New Zealand
Chaplains of the Order of St John
New Zealand cardinals
Cardinals created by Pope John Paul II
Roman Catholic archbishops of Wellington
Pontifical Urban University alumni
Alumni of University College Dublin
New Zealand Roman Catholic archbishops